Kendric Davis (born May 14, 1999) is an American college basketball player for the Memphis Tigers of the American Athletic Conference (AAC). He previously played for the TCU Horned Frogs and the SMU Mustangs.

High school career
Davis attended Sam Houston Math, Science, and Technology Center in Houston, Texas. He joined the varsity basketball team in his freshman season. As a senior, Davis averaged 22.6 points and 6.6 assists per game. He graduated as a two-time Class 6A All-State selection and a three-time 20-6A District MVP. A four-star recruit, Davis committed to playing college basketball for TCU over Kansas State and Texas.

College career
On February 9, 2019, Davis scored a freshman season-high 22 points for TCU in a 92–83 win over Iowa State. As a freshman, he averaged 6.3 points, two assists, and 1.7 rebounds per game in a reserve role. After the season, Davis transferred to SMU. His waiver for immediate eligibility was initially denied. After filing an appeal and sitting out for four games, his waiver was approved, largely because TCU supported the waiver. On January 4, 2020, Davis recorded a sophomore season-high 24 points and six assists in a 92–81 overtime victory over Vanderbilt. On February 1, he posted 18 points, 13 assists and nine rebounds, tying the American Athletic Conference (AAC) single-game assists record, in an 82–67 win over Tulane. As a sophomore, Davis averaged 14.2 points, an AAC-leading 6.7 assists and 4.1 rebounds per game, earning Third Team All-AAC honors. In June 2020, he tested positive for COVID-19 after returning to SMU for voluntary workouts. In his junior season debut on November 25, Davis scored a career-high 33 points in a 97–67 win against Sam Houston State. On January 7, 2021, he set an AAC record with 14 assists while scoring 14 points in a 76–69 loss to Cincinnati.

At the conclusion of the 2021–22 season, Davis was named the American Athletic Conference Player of the Year. He averaged 19.4 points, 3.8 rebounds and 4.4 assists per game while shooting 37.2% from three-point range. Following the season, Davis transferred to Memphis for his final season of eligibility. On January 23, 2023, he scored 26 points in an 80–68 win against Tulsa and surpassed the 2,000 point threshold.

Career statistics

College

|-
| style="text-align:left;"| 2018–19
| style="text-align:left;"| TCU
| 37 || 2 || 17.1 || .409 || .319 || .706 || 1.7 || 2.0 || .9 || .0 || 6.3
|-
| style="text-align:left;"| 2019–20
| style="text-align:left;"| SMU
| 26 || 26 || 34.8 || .449 || .311 || .854 || 4.1 || 6.7 || 1.2 || .1 || 14.2
|-
| style="text-align:left;"| 2020–21
| style="text-align:left;"| SMU
| 17 || 17 || 34.7 || .481 || .373 || .833 || 4.2 || 7.6 || 1.6 || .1 || 19.0
|-
| style="text-align:left;"| 2021–22
| style="text-align:left;"| SMU
| 32 || 32 || 34.6 || .439 || .372 || .868 || 3.8 || 4.4 || 1.5 || .1 || 19.4
|- class="sortbottom"
| style="text-align:center;" colspan="2"| Career
| 112 || 77 || 28.9 || .445 || .353 || .830 || 3.2 || 4.6 || 1.2 || .1 || 13.8

Personal life
Davis' brother, Paul Banks III, played college football for Texas Tech. In February 2018, Banks was arrested in connection with ATM robberies and was imprisoned. While playing for TCU, Davis wore the number five jersey to honor the Fifth Ward, Houston, the neighborhood where he grew up. He has expressed interest in becoming a commentator after his playing career.

See also
 List of NCAA Division I men's basketball career scoring leaders

References

External links
Memphis Tigers bio
SMU Mustangs bio
TCU Horned Frogs bio

1999 births
Living people
All-American college men's basketball players
American men's basketball players
Basketball players from Houston
Memphis Tigers men's basketball players
Point guards
SMU Mustangs men's basketball players
TCU Horned Frogs men's basketball players